María Loreto Carvajal Ambiado (born 18 May 1973) is a Chilean politician who currently serves at the Senate of Chile.

References

External links
 

1973 births
Living people
Catholic University of the Most Holy Conception alumni
Party for Democracy (Chile) politicians
Members of the Chamber of Deputies of Chile
Women members of the Chamber of Deputies of Chile
Members of the Senate of Chile
Women members of the Senate of Chile
21st-century Chilean politicians
21st-century Chilean women politicians
People from Bío Bío Province